Battle of Shusha may refer to:

 Battle of Shusha (1992), a battle fought between Armenian and Azerbaijani forces in the First Nagorno-Karabakh War
 Battle of Shusha (2020), a battle fought between Armenian and Azerbaijani forces in the 2020 Nagorno-Karabakh War